Two ships of the Royal Navy have been named HMS Hyderabad :

  the only purpose built Q-ship of World War I launched in 1917 and sold in 1920
  a  previously  HMS Nettle launched in 1941 and sold in 1948

Royal Navy ship names